Paetrobius is a genus of jumping bristletails in the family Machilidae.

References

Further reading

 
 
 
 
 

Archaeognatha
Articles created by Qbugbot